The 1983 Campeonato Brasileiro Série A was the 27th edition of the Campeonato Brasileiro Série A.

Overview
It was contested by 44 teams, and Flamengo won the championship.

First phase

Group A

Group B

Group C

Group D

Group E

Group F

Group G

Group H

Repechage

Second phase

Group I

Group J

Group K

Group L

Group M

Group N

Group O

Group P

Third phase

Group Q

Group R

Group S

Group T

Quarterfinals

Semifinals

Finals

First leg

Second leg

Final standings

References
 1983 Campeonato Brasileiro Série A at RSSSF

1983
1
Brazil
B